AVG Television is a payment television service provided by Audio Visual Global JSC. AVG Television develops on two platforms: DTT (digital terrestrial television) and DTH (direct to home), broadcasting to all Vietnamese territory. AVG television supports over 100 channels, including 9 high definition (HD) channels: An Vien HD, HBO HD, Fox Movies (Southeast Asia) HD, AXN HD, ESPN HD, Discovery HD, NGC HD, Fox Life (Asia) HD and Fashion TV HD.

Timeline
 10 October 2010, An Vien Television broadcast experimentally. 
 11 November 2011, An Vien Television officially broadcast. 
 1 January 2012, An Vien Television provided payment television service in Hanoi and Ho Chi Minh city.
 Since 1/5/2012, An Vien Television supported service in 63 provinces/cities through over 1000 post offices by VNPost.
 Since 1 January 2016, An Vien Television merge with Mobifone (one of two biggest Telecom Operator Company in Vietnam) and change to the new name is MobiTV. However, this merger is regarded controversial, and being cancelled following an investigation made by Ministry of Public Security and the Government Inspectorate Agency
 Since 2 April 2020, An Vien Television turned to AVG Television since the foundation of the network

Channels
AVG Television currently co-operated with several local television networks to broadcast their own channels. Their current channels including:
 BTV9 - An Vien TV (BChannel): Asian culture-oriented channel, co-operated with Binh Duong Radio & Television (BTV), Vietnam Cable Television (VTVcab) and Buddhist Sangha of Vietnam
 Phim Hay: Movie channel. Co-operated with Hanoi Cable Television JSC (Hanoicab)
 Hanoicab 3 - An Ninh Thế Giới: Documentary-themed, crime drama, information. Co-operated with Hanoicab JSC, Saigontourist Cable Television Co. Ltd and Media Department of Ministry of Public Security (Vietnam)
 Hanoicab 4 - MOV: Movies and entertainment channel. Co-operated with Hanoicab JSC 
 BPTV3 - ANT: Children-oriented channel. Co-operated with Binh Phuoc Media Consortium (Binh Phuoc Radio-Television & Press, BPTV)

An Vien Television also has various channels where the network has rights to transmit, including:
Vietnam Television: VTV1, VTV2, VTV3, VTV5, VTV6, VTV7, VTV8, VTV9
 Vietnam Digital Television Network: VTC1, VTC3, VTC7, VTC9, VTC14, VTC16
Ho Chi Minh City Television: HTV2, HTV3, HTV4, HTV7, HTV9, HTVC Thuần Việt, HTVC Thuần Việt, FBNC
 Other local channels: Hanoi TV1, Hanoi TV2, THVL1, STV1, STV2, THTPCT, THĐT1, BLTV, HANAM, ATV, NTV Nam Dinh, BGTV, THP, KTV, BPTV1, NTV Ninh Binh, THD, QTV1, BRT, Da Nang TV1, KG PTTH, BTV Binh Thuan, BTV Bac Ninh, ĐNRTV1, YTV
 International news: BBC World News, TV5MONDE, CNN, NHK World Japan, Channel NewsAsia, Arirang TV, DW
 Movies and series: HBO (Asia), Cinemax (Asia), Fox (Asia), WarnerTV, CinemaWorld, RED by HBO, Fox Movies (Asia)
 Entertainment: BBC Lifestyle, Fox (Asia), Fox Life, Fashion TV
 Documentary: Discovery Channel, TLC, Discovery Asia, Animal Planet, National Geographic Channel, BBC Earth
 Kids: Disney Channel, Disney Junior, Cartoon Network, CBeebies
 Sports: Fox Sports 1, Fox Sports 2
 Mainstream national channels: ANTV, QPVN, Vietnam News Assembly TV, VOVTV

External links
 Website

Television companies of Vietnam